The Roman Catholic Church in Piešťany, dedicated to St. Stephen, is in the old town of Piešťany, Slovakia and is a national cultural monument. The first mention of the Roman Catholic parish and church is from the year 1332. The current church was built between 1828 and 1832 in a classic Empire style. The walls and one arch in the choir began to split. The church was also affected by two earthquakes.

References

Roman Catholic churches completed in 1832
18th-century Roman Catholic church buildings in Slovakia
Churches in Trnava Region
Neoclassical church buildings in Slovakia